Kongsvinger Station is a railway station located in downtown Kongsvinger, Norway, on the Kongsvinger Line and Solør Line. The station was built in 1862 as part of the Kongsvinger Lin and designed in Swiss chalet style by Heinrich Ernst Schirmer and Wilhelm von Hanno. Later a branch line, the Solør Line, was built to Elverum.

The station is served by many Oslo Commuter Rail departures to and from Oslo Central Station. There are also stops by long-distance trains Oslo–Stockholm, and some regional trains to Charlottenberg and Karlstad in Sweden.

All bus services in Kongsvinger connect to the station, with hourly service offered by Innlandstrafikk. There are hourly buses westbound to Oslo, northbound to Elverum, and buses to Charlottenberg, and local buses in Kongsvinger.

The restaurant was taken over by Norsk Spisevognselskap on 1 July 1925, and subsequently renovated.

References

|- 

Railway stations in Hedmark
Railway stations on the Kongsvinger Line
Railway stations on the Solør Line
Railway stations opened in 1862
1862 establishments in Norway
Kongsvinger